Archer Maclean (28 January 1962 – 17 December 2022) was a British video game programmer. He was the author of Dropzone which he developed for the Atari 8-bit family and was ported to other systems. Maclean also developed the Commodore 64 version of International Karate and the sequel, IK+ which was developed for the Commodore 64 and ported to other systems. He was also known for his series of snooker and pool games, which commenced with Jimmy White's Whirlwind Snooker in 1991 (that was originally called 147).

Maclean left Awesome Studios—the studio he helped found and establish—in July 2005 and ran Awesome Play.

Maclean died on 17 December 2022, at the age of 60.

Early life
Maclean showed interest in electronics from an early age, being self taught by way of dismantling electronic devices. In 1972, he dismantled a television. In 1975, he commenced working part time in a television repair shop in Brentwood, Essex. 

After a chance meeting with its owner in 1976, Maclean started part-time work at electronics company Ambit International. This work allowed Maclean to start spending "unfeasibly large amounts of money on computer hardware, as a school kid".

Works
Maclean's first game, Dropzone, was heavily influenced by Stargate and Defender.

Maclean's final title for Awesome Studios was Archer Maclean's Mercury completed in 2005. The follow-up versions were Mercury Meltdown for the PlayStation Portable, Mercury Meltdown Remix for the PlayStation 2, and Mercury Meltdown Revolution for the Wii. Maclean then developed a futuristic racing game, WheelSpin, for the Wii.

Maclean also wrote a monthly column for Retro Gamer magazine.

References

External links
 Awesome Play 
 
 Archer Maclean interview from Halcyon Days
 2009 interview regarding the Wii from Wii's World

1962 births
2022 deaths
British computer programmers
British video game designers
Golden Joystick Award winners
Video game programmers